This is a list of the largest daily changes in the Dow Jones Industrial Average from 1896. Compare to the list of largest daily changes in the S&P 500 Index.

Largest percentage changes 

The first four tables show only the largest one-day changes between a given day's close and the close of the previous trading day, not the largest changes during the trading day (i.e. intraday changes).

Some sources (including the file Highlights/Lowlights of The Dow on the Dow Jones website) show a loss of −24.39% (from 71.42 to 54.00) on December 12, 1914, placing that day atop the list of largest percentage losses. The New York Stock Exchange reopened that day following a nearly four-and-a-half-month closure since July 30, 1914, and the Dow in fact rose 4.4% that day (from 71.42 to 74.56). However, the apparent decline was due to a later 1916 revision of the Dow Jones Industrial Average, which retroactively adjusted the values following the closure but not those before, and it represents the only discontinuity in the index's history rather than an actual loss.

Largest point changes 

The Dow Jones Industrial Average was first published in 1896, but since the firms listed at that time were in existence before then, the index can be calculated going back to May 2, 1881. A loss of just over 24 percent on May 5, 1893, from 39.90 to 30.02 signaled the apex of the stock effects of the Panic of 1893; the 2008–09 crash was a 61.8 percent retracement thereof that began on October 11, 2007, and lasted until the closing low on March 9, 2009.

The largest point drop in history occurred on March 16, 2020, when concerns over the ongoing COVID-19 pandemic engulfed the market, dropping the Dow Jones Industrial Average 2,997 points. The largest point gain (+2,113) occurred on March 24, 2020. As of August 4, 2020, all of the top seven and eight of the top ten largest point drops and point gains have been amid the 2020 stock market crash, which has been marked by extreme point swings.

Largest intraday point swings 
A point swing is the difference between the intraday high and the intraday low. (The intraday high may not be the same as the opening price; for instance, in the 2010 Flash Crash, the market reached an intraday high, higher than the opening price.)

This is distinguished from an intraday point drop or gain, which is the difference between the opening price and the intraday low or high.

This table shows the largest intraday point swings since 1987.  As the "Net Change" column shows, 11 of these 20 largest intraday swings occurred during days on which the Dow declined, and 9 occurred during days on which it advanced. None of the top 20 occurred before the year 2018.

During the 2020 stock market crash, fourteen of the top seventeen positions occurred in the month of March 2020.

Largest intraday point changes

Largest intraday point changes with turnovers

See also 
Dow Jones Industrial Average
Closing milestones of the Dow Jones Industrial Average
List of largest daily changes in the S&P 500
List of largest daily changes in the Nasdaq Composite
List of stock market crashes and bear markets, including:
Wall Street Crash of 1929 (October 24–29, 1929)
Black Monday (1987) (October 19, 1987)
Friday the 13th mini-crash (October 13, 1989)
October 27, 1997, mini-crash
Economic effects arising from the September 11 attacks
Financial crisis of 2007–08
2010 Flash Crash (May 6, 2010)
August 2011 stock markets fall
2020 stock market crash

References

External links 
 Dow Jones Indexes | Averages
 Dow Jones Indexes | Averages | Statistics
 Dow Jones Indexes | DJIA Historical Stock Prices

 
Economy-related lists of superlatives